Elections to Lewisham London Borough Council were held on 2 May 2002.  The whole council was up for election for the first time since the 1998 election.

Lewisham local elections are held every four years, with the next due in 2006.

Election result

|}

References

2002
2002 London Borough council elections